is a trans-Neptunian object from the scattered disc, located in the outermost region of the Solar System. It was discovered on 17 March 2015, by American astronomer Scott Sheppard at the Mauna Kea Observatories, Hawaii, and received the provisional designation .

Orbit and classification 

 orbits the Sun at a distance of 36.0–91.9 AU once every 511 years and 7 months (186,866 days; semi-major axis of 63.97 AU). Its orbit has an eccentricity of 0.44 and an inclination of 5° with respect to the ecliptic.

It is classified as a scattered disc object, or "near-scattered" in the classification of the Deep Ecliptic Survey, that still interacts gravitationally with Neptune (30.1 AU) due to its relatively low perihelion of 36.0 AU, contrary to the extended-scattered/detached objects and sednoids which never approach Neptune as close.

Most distant objects from the Sun 

Physical characteristics 

, no rotational lightcurve for this object has been obtained from photometric observations. The body's rotation period, pole and shape remain unknown.

References

External links 
 M.P.E.C. statistics for observer S. S. Sheppard
 
 

Minor planet object articles (unnumbered)

20150317